Subbanna is a Kannada Brahmin surname or given name that can refer to a number of people:

 K. V. Subbanna, a writer and playwright in Kannada language.
 Shimoga Subbanna, a music singer from Karnataka
 Subbanna Ekkundi, a Kannada language poet